Cirripectes kuwamurai is a species of combtooth blenny found on rocky and coral reefs in the northwest Pacific ocean off Japan.  This species reaches a length of  SL. The specific name honours the Japanese fish ecologist Tetsuo Kuwamura who collected the type.

References

kuwamurai
Fish described in 1984